Feroz or Firuz is a Persian name meaning 'victorious', derived from the middle Persian name Peroz or Piruz. Related names are Phiroze, Feroze, and Parviz.

It may refer to:

People (historical)
 Peroz I, Sasanian king of Iran
 Peroz II, Sasanian king of Iran
 Piruz Khosrow (died 642), Persian aristocrat who murdered the Sasanian queen of Iran Boran
 Abu Lu'lu'a Firuz (died 644), Persian slave who killed the second Islamic caliph Umar
 Peroz III (636 – 679), son of Yazdegerd III, the last Sasanian king of Iran, who traveled to Tang dynasty China and became a general and governor
 Firouz, a wealthy Armenian Christian convert to Islam who held a high post in Yaghi-Siyan's Seljuk Turkish government.  
 Ruknuddin Firuz, ruled the Delhi sultanate for a short time
 Jalal ud din Firuz Khalji, the first Indian ruler of the Delhi Sultanate and the founder of the Khalji dynasty
 Shamsuddin Firoz Shah, independent ruler of the Lakhnauti Kingdom
 Firuz Shah Tughlaq (1309 – 1388), Muslim ruler of the Tughlaq dynasty in India
 Alauddin Firuz Shah I, ruled the Sultanate of Bengal for a short time
 Jam Feroz, last ruler of the Samma Dynasty of Sindh
 Alauddin Firuz Shah II, three-month ruler of the Sultanate of Bengal
 Pherozeshah Mehta (1845 – 1915), Indian Parsi politician and lawyer
 Peruz Terzakyan (1866 – c. 1920), Ottoman Armenian kanto singer

People (modern)
 Fairuz, a Lebanese singer
 Farooq Feroze Khan, a Pakistan Air Force officer
 Feroz, nickname of Arsen Goulamirian (born 1987), Armenian born French professional boxer
 Feroz Abbasi, a British man held in extrajudicial detention in the United States Guantanamo Bay detainment camps in Cuba
 Feroz Abbas Khan, an Indian theatre and film director, playwright and screenwriter
 Feroz Ahmad, Indian historian and academic 
 Feroz Khan, an Indian actor, film editor, producer and director
 Feroz Khan Noon, a politician from Pakistan
 Feroze Gandhi, an Indian politician and journalist
 Feroze Khan (field hockey), a field hockey player who represented British India in the Olympics
 Firoz Khan, known as Arjun, Indian actor
 Firuz Kanatlı Turkish businessman, founder of the Eti company.
 Firuz Kazemzadeh, a professor emeritus of history at Yale University
 Firuz-Shah Zarrin-Kolah, an Iranian dignitary with Kurdish origin
 Pirouz Davani, an Iranian leftist activist
 Pirouz Mojtahedzadeh, an Iranian political scientist and historian
 Piruz Dilanchi, Azerbaijani activist

Characters
 Feroz, a planeswalker in Magic: The Gathering
 Hajji Firuz, the traditional herald of Nowruz

Places
 Firuz District, of Iran
 Firuz, Kerman, a village in Kerman Province, Iran
 Naushahro Feroze District, a district in Sindh, Pakistan
 Naushahro Feroze, a town in Naushahro Feroze District, Sindh, Pakistan
 Piruz, Iran, a village in Hamadan
 Piruzabad, Kerman
 Piruzabad, Khuzestan
 Piruzabad, Golestan
 Piruzeh, a village in Kermanshah Province

Film and television

 Feroz (film), a 1984 Spanish film
 Feroz (telenovela), a 2010 Chilean telenovela

Other

 Feroz Shah Kotla, a cricket ground in Delhi, India
 Firuz Ağa Mosque, a mosque in Istanbul, Turkey

See also

 Piruz (disambiguation)
 Parviz (disambiguation)